Omobranchus germaini, Germain's blenny, is a species of combtooth blenny found in coral reefs in the western Pacific ocean.  This species can reach a length of  TL. The specific name honours the collector of the type, the French military veterinarian Louis Rodolphe Germain (1827-1917).

References

germaini
Taxa named by Henri Émile Sauvage
Fish described in 1883